Clark County High School (CCHS) is a public high school in Kahoka, Missouri, United States. It is part of the Clark County R-1 School District.

History 
In 2018, two students made separate gun threats a week apart causing both to be apprehended by police and banned from school grounds. In 2019, the school celebrated 200 veterans in its auditorium for veteran's day. The majority of the veterans were from Clark County.

Academics 
61.9% were proficient in English. 70.5% were proficient in social studies and 33.8 were proficient in mathematics. The average ACT score is 20.9, which is 0.1 above the average for the state of Missouri. 98.46% of students graduate with 63.10% students enrolling in college.

References

External links 
 

Education in Clark County, Missouri
Buildings and structures in Clark County, Missouri
Public high schools in Missouri